Piney River is an unincorporated community in Nelson County, Virginia, United States.  It lies along the path of the now-defunct Virginia Blue Ridge Railway.

References

GNIS reference

Unincorporated communities in Nelson County, Virginia
Unincorporated communities in Virginia